Illegitimi non carborundum is a mock-Latin aphorism, often translated as "Don't let the bastards grind you down". The phrase itself has no meaning in Latin and can only be mock-translated.

History
The phrase originated during World War II. Lexicographer Eric Partridge attributes it to British army intelligence very early in the war (using the dative plural illegitimis).

The phrase was adopted by US Army General "Vinegar" Joe Stilwell as his motto during the war, in the form Illegitimati non carborundum.  It was later further popularized in the US by 1964 presidential candidate Barry Goldwater.

The phrase is also used as the first line of one of the extra dog Latin verses added in 1953 to an unofficial school song at Harvard University, "Ten Thousand Men of Harvard". This most frequently played fight song of the Harvard University Band is, to some extent, a parody of more solemn school songs like "Fair Harvard thy Sons to your Jubilee Throng". The first verse is a nonsense sequence of Latin clichés:

Illegitimum non carborundum;
Domine salvum fac.
Illegitimum non carborundum;
Domine salvum fac.
Gaudeamus igitur!
Veritas non sequitur?
Illegitimum non carborundum—ipso facto!

The phrase, often accompanied by an English translation, has appeared in many places:
 1958, the novel Saturday Night and Sunday Morning, and film of the same name, as the motto of the main character, Arthur Seaton.
 1963, possibly earlier, as illegitimus non carborundum used as the motto incorporated into the masthead of the Whitehorse Star newspaper.
1984, the motto of 2nd battalion, 1st Special Forces Group (United States)
 1985 (as Nolite te Bastardes Carborundorum), the novel The Handmaid's Tale. The phrase is depicted as graffiti representing a "silent revolt" by a "slave woman in a futuristic totalitarian regime". Vanity Fair called the phrase a "feminist rallying cry".
 1991, the final line of the chorus in the U2 song "Acrobat" is "Don't let the bastards grind you down".
 1997, the second-wave ska band The Toasters' song "Don't Let The Bastards Grind You Down" appeared in the pilot episode of the animated series Mission Hill.
 2014, the desk of former Speaker of the U.S. House of Representatives John Boehner.

"Latin" meaning
The sentence is Dog Latin, that is, it is a Latin–English pun with only a mock translation.

The first word varies between illegitimi and illegitimis. Illegitimi is presumably the nominative plural of illegitimus meaning "unlawful" or "outlaw" in Latin, but interpreted as English "illegitimate" in the sense of "bastard", in this case, used as a generic insult.

Illegitimis may be intended as an ablative plural, but if carborundum is intended to resemble a gerundive, it is more likely intended as a dative plural, since the gerundive takes a dative of agent. The meaning, in either case, is "by the outlaws/bastards."

The second word non is a straightforward negation.

The third word, carborundum, is an abrasive used for industrial grinding. It is not a Latin word; instead, it is a genericized trademark derived from the word corundum, a word of Tamil origin. However, it resembles a Latin gerundive, so can be interpreted as a hypothetical "fit to be carborere-ed" or "to be carborere-ed".

If  (3rd conjugation) were a Latin word meaning "to grind down", Illegitimis non carborundum would be correct Latin for "(It/One) must not be ground down by the outlaws".

There are many variants of the phrase, such as Illegitimis non carborundum, Noli illegitimi carborundum and Nil illegitimi carborundum, all of them Dog Latin. Sometimes (as in The Handmaid's Tale), carborundum is prolonged to carborundorum, as if a Latin second declension neuter genitive plural of a noun ending in -um. This is purely jocular and cannot have a grammatical meaning in Latin.

See also
 List of Latin phrases

References

External links

Two alternative explanations

Dog Latin words and phrases